Ubiquitin-conjugating enzyme E2 variant 1, also known as Kua-UEV, is a human gene.

The Kua-UEV mRNA is an infrequent but naturally occurring co-transcribed product of the neighboring Kua and UBE2V1 genes. Ubiquitin-conjugating E2 enzyme variant proteins constitute a distinct subfamily within the E2 protein family. They have sequence similarity to other ubiquitin-conjugating enzymes but lack the conserved cysteine residue that is critical for the catalytic activity of E2s. Two alternative transcripts encoding different isoforms have been described. The proteins produced by these transcripts have UEV1 B domains but the proteins are localized to the cytoplasm rather than to the nucleus. The significance of these co-transcribed mRNAs and the function of their protein products have not yet been determined.

References

Further reading